is a Japanese speed skater. She competed at the 2011, 2013 and 2014 World Sprint Championships, and at the 2014 Winter Olympics in Sochi.

References 

1985 births
Japanese female speed skaters
Speed skaters at the 2014 Winter Olympics
Olympic speed skaters of Japan
Speed skaters at the 2011 Asian Winter Games
Speed skaters at the 2017 Asian Winter Games
Living people